
The Avia BH-26 was a two-seat armed reconnaissance aircraft built in Czechoslovakia in 1927. It was a single-bay unstaggered biplane with equal-span wings and a fixed tailskid undercarriage. Both upper and lower wings featured long-span ailerons, which were dynamically balanced by a small auxiliary airfoil mounted to the upper surface of the lower ailerons. Its design was typical of this type of aircraft built during World War I and the years following; pilot and observer sat in tandem open cockpits with the observer armed with a machine gun on a ring mount. As with many other Avia designs, the BH-26 originally had no fixed fin, only a rudder, but this was changed in service.

Specifications

See also

References

Further reading
 
 
 

BH-26
1920s Czechoslovakian military reconnaissance aircraft
Single-engined tractor aircraft
Biplanes
Aircraft first flown in 1927